Darwha Moti Bagh railway station is a small railway station in Yavatmal district in the Indian state of Maharashtra. Its code is DWM. It serves Darwha city. The station consists of one platforms. The platform is not well sheltered. It lacks many facilities including water and sanitation.

Historic Shakuntala Express used to runs starts from this station. Shakuntala Express was founded by the British government when they ruled India. Due to its age, it has gained historical importance.
 This station will become junction when Wardha–Nanded line will join Shakuntala Railway.

Trains 

 Shakuntala Express

References

Railway stations in Yavatmal district
Bhusawal railway division
Railway stations opened in 1912
1912 establishments in India